Felpéc is a village in Győr-Moson-Sopron county, Hungary. An organ of a pleasing tone was built in the Lutheran church (1620) of excellent acoustics. Primeval juniper nature conservation area especially suitable for walking tours.

External links 
 Street map 

Populated places in Győr-Moson-Sopron County